Vignjević is a Serbian surname. Notable people with the surname include:

Milan Vignjević (born 1989), Serbian football player
Nebojša Vignjević (born 1968), Serbian footballer and manager
Nikola Vignjević (born 1971), Serbian footballer and coach

Serbian surnames